Blood 148A is an Indian reserve of the Kainai Nation in Alberta, located within Improvement District No. 4. It is on the left bank of the Belly River, about 1.5 miles north of the international boundary.

References

Indian reserves in Alberta
Kainai Nation